Gangstagrass is an American bluegrass and hip hop group, most known for the theme song of the FX television show Justified. The group is founded and led by Brooklyn producer Rench (Oscar Owens), and combine authentic bluegrass and rap into a new genre.

History

Initially formed in 2006, Gangstagrass started to see its music reaching a wide audience when the band's song "Long Hard Times to Come", was selected to be the opening theme song of the acclaimed television show Justified on FX in early 2010.  On July 8, 2010, Gangstagrass producer Rench and rapper T.O.N.E.Z were nominated for an Emmy in the category of Outstanding Original Main Title Theme Music for "Long Hard Times to Come."

The Justified series is based on the work of writer Elmore Leonard, who was a fan of Gangstagrass' music:

Gangstagrass released the full-length album Lightning On The Strings, Thunder On The Mic featuring T.O.N.E-z in 2010, and another full-length album Rappalachia featuring various rappers in 2012. Broken Hearts and Stolen Money, the band's third full-length studio album, was released in 2014 and included a hidden track of Will the Circle Be Unbroken. Gangstagrass followed up the next year with American Music, which spent several weeks in the top 10 bluegrass albums on Billboard, marking the first time real hip-hop MCs reached the top 10 on the bluegrass chart. Gangstagrass released a live album in early 2019, Pocket Full of Fire, featuring songs recorded at various venues around the United States in 2018. This album also spent several weeks on the Billboard's top 10 bluegrass albums chart.

On Sept 12, 2019, Gangstagrass performed at The Station Inn, the first time ever that hip-hop MCs performed at the legendary Nashville bluegrass venue. In a preview of that performance, Rolling Stone called Gangstagrass "a fresh, much-needed take on traditional roots music."

The band's fifth studio album, No Time For Enemies, was released August 14, 2020, five months into the COVID-19 pandemic. Only three of the songs on the album had been recorded in studio when the COVID-19 lockdowns forced everyone to stay home. The remaining eight songs on the album were recorded by each member of the band individually, sending their parts to Rench, who produced the album from these component parts. The album quickly rose to #1 on the Billboard bluegrass chart, marking the first time in history that an album featuring hip-hop MCs held the top spot on the Billboard bluegrass chart. In its review of the album, Americana Highways magazine declared that Gangstagrass "establishes themselves as America’s Band with No Time For Enemies".

The lineup of Gangstagrass since 2018 has been Rench (vocals, guitar, beats), Dolio the Sleuth (MC, vocals), R-SON the Voice of Reason (MC), Dan "Danjo" Whitener (vocals, banjo), and B.E. Farrow (vocals, fiddle). The MCs and bluegrass players involved in performances have changed from the first album, coordinated by Rench in his role as producer and main contributor.

In 2021, the band auditioned for a place on the 16th season of America's Got Talent and received four yeses from the judges — Simon Cowell, Sofia Vergara, Heidi Klum, and Howie Mandel — and an enthusiastic response from host Terry Crews on the way to becoming quarter-finalists.

Gangstagrass's No Time For Enemies release tour was delayed due to the COVID-19 pandemic, with their full tour of live shows resuming in spring 2022.

Discography

Studio albums
Rench Presents: Gangstagrass (2007)
Lightning on the Strings, Thunder on the Mic (May 2010)
Rappalachia (May 2012)
Broken Hearts and Stolen Money (2014)
American Music (2015)
No Time For Enemies (2020)

Live albums
Pocket Full of Fire: Gangstagrass Live (February 15, 2019)

Singles
"Long Hard Times To Come" (2010)
"Give It Up (Feat. T.O.N.E-z)" (2011)
"Gunslinging Rambler (Feat. R-SON the Voice of Reason)" (2012)
"Shoot Dem (Feat. T.O.N.E-z)" (2012)
"Western (Feat. Kool Keith)" (2012)
"Bound to Ride (Feat. R-SON the Voice of Reason and Dolio the Sleuth)" (2012)
"Keep Talking (Feat. Dolio the Sleuth)" (2014)
"All For One (Feat. Dolio the Sleuth and R-SON the Voice of Reason)" (2014)
"Barnburning (Feat. Melody Allegra Berger, R-SON the Voice of Reason, and Dolio the Sleuth)" (2015)
"Nickel and Dime Blues" (2020)
"Freedom" (2020)
"Ain't No Crime" (2020)
"What I Am" (2020)
"Bound to Ride - 2021 Version" (2021)
"Please Don't Take My Home" (2021)

References

Further reading
Stoli Congrats Gangstagrass For Their 2010 Emmy Nom", Skope July 19, 2010
Newsome, Kent "Gangstagrass, Justified, and Remapping My Musical Genome", Newsome.org, June 20, 2010
Fretts, Bruce "Justified: Right in Tune", TV Guide, June 1, 2010
Lawless, John "Gangstagrass returns with a new CD", The Bluegrass Blog, May 24, 2010
Smith, Nancy Dewolf, "Only if you make me" , The Wall Street Journal, March 26, 2010
Munro, Stuart, The Boston Globe, January 28, 2014
Freeman, Jon, et al., "10 New Country Artists You Need to Know", Rolling Stone, April 2017
Zimmerman, Lee, "Bluegrass Beyond Borders: Gangstagrass takes their sound to a decidedly new destination", Bluegrass Today, June 6, 2019 
Hood, Abby Lee, "How History Books Erased the Marginalized Voices That Built Bluegrass", VICE, May 19, 2020
Taylor, Katherine Yeske, "Gangstagrass Explains The Message Behind "Freedom," Premieres Video", American Songwriter, June 2020
Schwind, Gary, "Gangstagrass Explore Race and Politics with Banjos and Beats on ‘No Time for Enemies’", Glide Magazine, August 11, 2020
Elliott, Mike, "Gangstagrass Makes a Timely Statement on ‘No Time for Enemies’", No Depression, August 11, 2020

External links

American bluegrass music groups
American hip hop groups
Musicians from New York City
Country musicians from New York (state)
America's Got Talent contestants